Boyuk Qeshlaq (Azerbaijani: Böyük Qışlaq, also Romanized as Boyūk Qeshlāq; also known as Buyik Qishlaq and Buyuk-Kishlak) is a village in Karasf Rural District, in the Central District of Khodabandeh County, Zanjan Province, Iran. At the 2006 census, its population was 142, in 27 families.

References 

Populated places in Khodabandeh County